Khlong Tha Lat is a natural khlong (canal) in Chachoengsao Province, eastern Thailand.

It originated from Khlong Si Yat and Khlong Rabom in the Chanthaburi Mountains in the area of Sanam Chai Khet District. Then it flows through Phanom Sarakham and Ratchasan Districts up till ends at the confluence the Bang Pakong River at Pak Nam Subdistrict, Bang Khla District, where it is referred to as the "Pak Nam Jolo" (ปากน้ำโจ้โล้) or "Pak Nam Jaolo" (ปากน้ำเจ้าโล่) as spelled in the past.

The area where it merges the Bang Pakong River, it is the oldest community in Chachoengsao. It is old and contemporary with Ayutthaya Kingdom, or maybe even older than that. In the second fall of Ayutthaya in 1767, it was occupied by the Burmese army. As time passed, the reign of King Rama I to coincide with the early Rattanakosin era, it was the capital district of Chachoengsao Province.

At present at Pak Nam Jolo, a cetiya (pagoda) was built to commemorate King Taksin. The warrior king who led the Siamese army repelled the Burmese army and established a new capital to replace the damaged Ayutthaya, Thonburi. It is believed that he had led the Ayutthaya army to fight the Burmese in this area after escaping from Ayutthaya. However, according to reliable historical evidence from the Fine Arts Department, this event did not actually happen here.

Notes

 Rivers of Thailand
Geography of Chachoengsao province